Muhamet (Bet) Vila (7 March 1928 – 18 January 2002) was an Albanian footballer who played his entire professional career as defender for Dinamo Tirana football club.

Playing career

Club
Paired with Xhevdet Shaqiri he formed the backbone of the defense for a Dinamo team that went on to win 6 league titles in the 1950s.

International
He made his debut for Albania in a November 1952 friendly match against Czechoslovakia and earned a total of 3 caps, scoring no goals. His final international was a November 1953 friendly against Poland.

Managerial career
Vila served as head coach of Besa Kavajë in the 1970s and helped lead the club to 2 Albania Cup finals appearances and to the final of the Balkan Cup tournament of 1971.

Personal life
His son Arben also played for Dinamo and the national team in the 1980s.

Honours
Albanian Superliga: 7
 1950, 1951, 1952, 1953, 1955, 1956, 1960

References

1928 births
2002 deaths
Footballers from Kavajë
Albanian footballers
Association football defenders
Albania international footballers
FK Dinamo Tirana players
Albanian football managers
Besa Kavajë managers
Kategoria Superiore players
Kategoria Superiore managers